Darwin Smith (1926-1995) was CEO of Kimberly-Clark from 1971 to 1991. He held degrees from Indiana University (BA) and Harvard Law School.

References

1995 deaths
1926 births
Harvard Law School alumni
American chief executives
Indiana University alumni